Choi Gyu-Jin (최 규진, born June 28, 1985) is a male wrestler from South Korea. He won 2013 world wrestling contest.

External links
 bio on fila-wrestling.com

Living people
1985 births
South Korean male sport wrestlers
Wrestlers at the 2012 Summer Olympics
Olympic wrestlers of South Korea
Wrestlers at the 2010 Asian Games
World Wrestling Championships medalists
Asian Games competitors for South Korea
Asian Wrestling Championships medalists
20th-century South Korean people
21st-century South Korean people